William Knapp Thorn, Jr. (April 10, 1848 – November 16, 1910) was an American champion polo player and the grandson of Commodore Cornelius Vanderbilt. Also, he was a hunter and horse-rider. He was one of the best-known sportsmen in the United States and France.

Biography
He was born in 1848 to William Knapp Thorn and Emily Almira Vanderbilt Thorn. Thorn received his LLB from Columbia Law School in 1870.

Thorn participated in the 1886 International Polo Cup with teammates Foxhall Parker Keene and Thomas Hitchcock, Sr.

Thorn hunted at Pau, France beginning in 1887 along with his cousin Alfred Torrance, who had hunted there from 1882. Thorn made Pau his primary residence after the deaths of his sister, Emma Sophia Thorn King Parrish, his cousin Alfred Torrance and his father - all between February and May 1887. It was at Pau that he raised his sister's orphaned children; Louise Thorn King Baring, Emilie Thorn King Post and Herbert Thorn King. Thorn's aunt, Sophia Johnson Vanderbilt Torrance also had a villa at Pau (now demolished). Mrs. Torrance donated the funds to build the Pau Hunt kennels, stables and lodging for the Pau Hunt whip in memory of her son Alfred.

Thorn served on the committee of the Pau Hunt and a was a member of the English Club. He was Master of the Pau Hounds from 1888 -1890. He served as the Pau Hunt Committee Chairman from 1903 until his death.<

Thorn along with James Gordon Bennett, Jr. were founders of the defunct Pau Polo Club.

He contribute to the development of cars and motorsport in the region of Pau. He and Georges Nitot founded the Automobile-club of Bearn, which organised the first motor races in the southwest of France in 1899. This race became the famous Pau Grand Prix which is still popular today.

Thorn died in Pau on November 16, 1910 and was interred at Green-Wood Cemetery on January 9, 1911.

References

External links
 Thorn Family Gravesite
 Torrance Family Gravesite

1848 births
1910 deaths
American polo players
International Polo Cup
William Knapp
Columbia Law School alumni
19th-century American Episcopalians
19th-century American businesspeople
People from New York City